Oliver Ferenc (born 5 November 1969) is a Serbian darts player currently playing in World Darts Federation (WDF) events.

Career

He qualified for the PDC World Championship for the first time in 2012 by winning the South-East Europe Qualifier. Ferenc played Joe Cullen in the preliminary round and was beaten by 4 legs to 2. He moved to 122 in the PDC Order of Merit after the Championship. In May, he reached the final of the Hungarian Open where he lost to Dave Prins. Ferenc was beaten in the final of the 2015 FCD Anniversary Open by Kevin Simm.

World Championship results

PDC
 2012: Preliminary round (lost to Joe Cullen 2–4) (legs)

BDO
 2019: First round (lost to Scott Mitchell 0–3)

References

External links

1969 births
Serbian darts players
Living people
Professional Darts Corporation associate players
British Darts Organisation players